Gynnidomorpha mesotypa is a species of moth of the family Tortricidae. It is found in China (Guizhou, Jiangsu, Shaanxi, Shanghai) and Japan.

The wingspan is 13–14 mm.

The larvae feed on Sagittaria species.

References

Moths described in 1970
Cochylini